Gorgonidia maronensis is a moth of the family Erebidae first described by Walter Rothschild in 1917. It is found in French Guiana, Ecuador, Peru and Bolivia.

References

Phaegopterina
Moths described in 1917